The Book of Jonah is one of the twelve minor prophets of the Nevi'im ("Prophets") in the Hebrew Bible, and as a book in its own right in the Christian Old Testament. The book tells of a Hebrew prophet named Jonah, son of Amittai, who is sent by God to prophesy the destruction of Nineveh, but tries to escape this divine mission. 

The story has a long interpretive history and has become well known through popular children's stories. In Judaism, it is the Haftarah portion read during the afternoon of Yom Kippur to instill reflection on God's willingness to forgive those who repent, and it remains a popular story among Christians. The story is also retold in the Quran.

Date

The prophet Jonah is mentioned in 2 Kings 14:25, which places Jonah's life during the reign of Jeroboam II (786–746 BC), but the book of Jonah itself does not mention a king or any other details that would give the text a firm date. The majority of scholars date the book much later, to the post-exilic period sometime between the late 5th to early 4th century BC; perhaps (along with Book of Ruth) as a counter to the emphasis on racial purity in the time of Ezra. An even later date is sometimes proposed, with Katherine Dell arguing for the Hellenistic period (332–167 BC).

Narrative 
Unlike the other Minor Prophets, the book of Jonah is almost entirely narrative (with the exception of the poem in the 2nd chapter). The actual prophetic word against Nineveh is given only in passing through the narrative. The story of Jonah has a setting, characters, a plot, and themes; it also relies heavily on such literary devices as irony.

Outline
The outline of the book of Jonah:
 Jonah flees his mission (chapters 1–2)
 Jonah's commission and flight (1:1–3)
 The endangered sailors cry to their gods (1:4–6)
 Jonah's disobedience exposed (1:7–10)
 Jonah's punishment and deliverance (1:11–2:1;2:10)
 His prayer of thanksgiving (2:2–9)
 Jonah reluctantly fulfills his mission (chapters 3–4)
 Jonah's renewed commission and obedience (3:1–4)
 The endangered Ninevites' repentant appeal to the Lord (3:4–9)
 The Ninevites' repentance acknowledged (3:10–4:4)
 Jonah's deliverance and rebuke (4:5–11)

Summary

Jonah is the central character in the Book of Jonah, in which Yahweh commands him to go to the city of Nineveh to prophesy against it for their great wickedness against him. However, Jonah instead attempts to run from Yahweh by going to Jaffa and sailing to Tarshish. A huge storm arises and the sailors, realizing that it is no ordinary storm, cast lots and discover that Jonah is to blame. Jonah admits this and states that if he is thrown overboard, the storm will cease. The sailors refuse to do this and continue rowing, but all their efforts fail and they are eventually forced to throw Jonah overboard. As a result, the storm calms and the sailors then offer sacrifices to Yahweh. Jonah is miraculously saved by being swallowed by a large fish, in whose belly he spends three days and three nights. While in the great fish, Jonah prays to God in his affliction and commits to thanksgiving and to paying what he has vowed. God then commands the fish to vomit Jonah out.

God then once again commands Jonah to travel to Nineveh and prophesy to its inhabitants. This time he reluctantly goes into the city, crying, "In forty days Nineveh shall be overthrown." After Jonah has walked across Nineveh, the people of Nineveh begin to believe his word and proclaim a fast. The king of Nineveh then puts on sackcloth and sits in ashes, making a proclamation which decrees fasting, the wearing of sackcloth, prayer, and repentance. God sees their repentant hearts and spares the city at that time. The entire city is humbled and broken with the people (and even the animals) in sackcloth and ashes.

Displeased by this, Jonah refers to his earlier flight to Tarshish while asserting that, since God is merciful, it was inevitable that God would turn from the threatened calamities. He then leaves the city and makes himself a shelter, waiting to see whether or not the city will be destroyed. God causes a plant (in Hebrew a ) to grow over Jonah's shelter to give him some shade from the sun. Later, God causes a worm to bite the plant's root and it withers. Jonah, now being exposed to the full force of the sun, becomes faint and pleads for God to kill him.

Interpretive history

Early Jewish interpretation
Fragments of the book were found among the Dead Sea Scrolls, most of which follows the Masoretic Text closely and with Mur XII reproducing a large portion of the text. As for the non-canonical writings, the majority of references to biblical texts were made as appeals to authority. The Book of Jonah appears to have served less purpose in the Qumran community than other texts, as the writings make no references to it.

Late Jewish interpretation
The 18th century Lithuanian master scholar and kabbalist, Elijah of Vilna, known as the Vilna Gaon, authored a commentary on the biblical Book of Jonah as an allegory of reincarnation.

Early Christian interpretation

New Testament

The earliest Christian interpretations of Jonah are found in the Gospel of Matthew and the Gospel of Luke. Both Matthew and Luke record a tradition of Jesus' interpretation of the Book of Jonah (notably, Matthew includes two very similar traditions in chapters 12 and 16).

As with most Old Testament interpretations found in the New Testament, Jesus' interpretation is primarily typological. Jonah becomes a "type" for Jesus. Jonah spent three days in the belly of the fish; Jesus will spend three days in the grave. Here, Jesus plays on the imagery of Sheol found in Jonah's prayer. While Jonah metaphorically declared, "Out of the belly of Sheol I cried," Jesus will literally be in the belly of Sheol. Finally, Jesus compares his generation to the people of Nineveh. Jesus fulfills his role as a type of Jonah, however his generation fails to fulfill its role as a type of Nineveh. Nineveh repented, but Jesus' generation, which has seen and heard one even greater than Jonah, fails to repent. Through his typological interpretation of the Book of Jonah, Jesus has weighed his generation and found it wanting.

Augustine of Hippo
The debate over the credibility of the miracle of Jonah is not simply a modern one. The credibility of a human being surviving in the belly of a great fish has long been questioned. In , Augustine of Hippo wrote to Deogratias concerning the challenge of some to the miracle recorded in the Book of Jonah. He writes:

Augustine responds that if one is to question one miracle, then one should question all miracles as well (section 31). Nevertheless, despite his apologetic, Augustine views the story of Jonah as a figure for Christ. For example, he writes: "As, therefore, Jonah passed from the ship to the belly of the whale, so Christ passed from the cross to the sepulchre, or into the abyss of death. And as Jonah suffered this for the sake of those who were endangered by the storm, so Christ suffered for the sake of those who are tossed on the waves of this world." Augustine credits his allegorical interpretation to the interpretation of Christ himself (Matthew 12:39–40), and he allows for other interpretations as long as they are in line with Christ's.

Medieval commentary tradition

Ryan McDermott comments that "The Gloss on Jonah relies almost exclusively on Jerome's commentary on Jonah, so its Latin often has a tone of urbane classicism. But the Gloss also chops up, compresses, and rearranges Jerome with a carnivalesque glee and scholastic directness that renders the Latin authentically medieval." "The Ordinary Gloss on Jonah" has been translated into English and printed in a format that emulates the first printing of the Gloss.

The relationship between Jonah and his fellow Jews is ambivalent, and complicated by the Gloss's tendency to read Jonah as an allegorical prefiguration of Jesus Christ. While some glosses in isolation seem crudely supersessionist ("The foreskin believes while the circumcision remains unfaithful"), the prevailing allegorical tendency is to attribute Jonah's recalcitrance to his abiding love for his own people and his insistence that God's promises to Israel not be overridden by a lenient policy toward the Ninevites. For the glossator, Jonah's pro-Israel motivations correspond to Christ's demurral in the Garden of Gethsemane ("My Father, if it be possible, let this chalice pass from me") and the Gospel of Matthew's and Paul's insistence that "salvation is from the Jews" (John 4:22). While in the Gloss the plot of Jonah prefigures how God will extend salvation to the nations, it also makes abundantly clear—as some medieval commentaries on the Gospel of John do not—that Jonah and Jesus are Jews, and that they make decisions of salvation-historical consequence as Jews.

Modern
In Jungian analysis, the belly of the whale can be seen as a symbolic death and rebirth, which is also an important stage in comparative mythologist Joseph Campbell's "hero's journey".

NCSY Director of Education David Bashevkin sees Jonah as a thoughtful prophet who comes to religion out of a search for theological truth and is constantly disappointed by those who come to religion to provide mere comfort in the face of adversity inherent to the human condition. "If religion is only a blanket to provide warmth from the cold, harsh realities of life," Bashevkin imagines Jonah asking, "did concerns of theological truth and creed even matter?" The lesson taught by the episode of the tree at the end of the book is that comfort is a deep human need that religion provides, but that this need not obscure the role of God.

Jonah and the "big fish" 

The Hebrew text of Jonah reads , literally meaning "great fish". At some point,  became synonymous with whale (cf. cetyl alcohol, which is alcohol derived from whales). Tyndale's translation was later followed by the translators of the King James Version of 1611 and has enjoyed general acceptance in English translations.

The verses therefore read: "And the lord provided a great fish (masculine) for Jonah, and it swallowed him, and Jonah sat in the belly of the fish (still male) for three days and nights; then, from the belly of the (female) fish, Jonah began to pray."

The peculiarity of this change of gender led later rabbis to conclude that Jonah was comfortable enough in the roomy male fish to not pray, and because of this God transferred him to a smaller, female fish, in which Jonah was uncomfortable, to which he prayed.

Jonah and the gourd vine 

The Book of Jonah closes abruptly with an epistolary warning based on the emblematic trope of a fast-growing vine present in Persian narratives, and popularized in fables such as The Gourd and the Palm-tree during the Renaissance, for example by Andrea Alciato.

The Renaissance humanist artist Albrecht Dürer memorialized Jerome's decision to use an analogical type of Christ's "I am the Vine, you are the branches" in his woodcut Saint Jerome in His Study.

References

Bibliography

External links 

 An English translation of the most important medieval Christian commentary on Jonah, "The Ordinary Gloss on Jonah," PMLA 128.2 (2013): 424–38.
 A brief introduction to Jonah
  Various versions
The Religion of Islam (2009), Prophet Jonah

 
5th-century BC books
4th-century BC books
Jonah
Jonah